Harpalus is a genus of ground beetle first described by Pierre André Latreille in 1802.

Species
Harpalus contains the following 409 species:

 Harpalus actiosus Casey, 1914
 Harpalus acupalpoides Reitter, 1900
 Harpalus aeneipennis (Faldermann, 1836) 
 Harpalus aenigma (Tschitscherine, 1897)
 Harpalus aequicollis Motschulsky, 1844
 Harpalus affinis (Schrank, 1781)
 Harpalus agakhaniantzi (Mikhailov, 1972)
 Harpalus agnatus Reiche, 1849
 Harpalus akinini Tschitscherine, 1895
 Harpalus alajensis Tschitscherine, 1898
 Harpalus albanicus Reitter, 1900
 Harpalus alexandrae Kataev, 1990
 Harpalus alexeevi Kataev, 1990
 Harpalus alienus Bates, 1878
 Harpalus alpivagus Tschitscherine, 1899
 Harpalus amarellus Bates, 1891
 Harpalus amariformis Motschulsky, 1844
 Harpalus amplicollis Menetries, 1848
 Harpalus amputatus Say, 1830
 Harpalus anatolicus Tschitscherine, 1898
 Harpalus angulatus Putzeys, 1878
 Harpalus angustipennis Boheman, 1848
 Harpalus angustitarsis Reitter, 1887
 Harpalus animosus Casey, 1924
 Harpalus anisodactyliformis Solsky, 1874
 Harpalus antonowi (Tschitscherine, 1898)
 Harpalus anxioides Kataev, 1991
 Harpalus anxius (Duftschmid, 1812)
 Harpalus aogashimensis (Habu, 1957)
 Harpalus apache Kataev, 2010
 Harpalus araraticus Mlynar, 1979
 Harpalus arcuatus Tschitscherine, 1898
 Harpalus arnoldii Kataev, 1988
 Harpalus ascetes Kataev & Wrase, 1997
 Harpalus asemus Basilewsky, 1946
 Harpalus asphaltinus Roth, 1851
 Harpalus aterrimus Casey, 1914
 Harpalus atratus Latreille, 1804
 Harpalus atrichatus Hatch, 1949
 Harpalus atripes Casey, 1914
 Harpalus attenuatus Stephens, 1828
 Harpalus australasiae Dejean, 1829
 Harpalus autumnalis (Duftschmid, 1812)
 Harpalus azumai Habu, 1968
 Harpalus babai Habu, 1973
 Harpalus badakschanus Jedlicka, 1956
 Harpalus baleensis Clarke, 1973
 Harpalus balli Noonan, 1991 
 Harpalus basanicus J.R. Sahlberg, 1911
 Harpalus basilewskyi Facchini, 2003
 Harpalus basuto Basilewsky, 1958
 Harpalus bellieri Reiche, 1861
 Harpalus beneshi Kataev & Wrase, 1997
 Harpalus brachypterus Tschitcherine, 1898
 Harpalus brevicornis Germar, 1824
 Harpalus brevis Motschiulsky, 1844
 Harpalus breviusculus Chaudoir, 1846
 Harpalus brunnipes Dejean, 1829
 Harpalus bucharicus Tschitscherine, 1898
 Harpalus bungii Chaudoir, 1844
 Harpalus caeruleatus Bates, 1878
 Harpalus caiphus Reiche & Saulcy, 1855
 Harpalus calathoides Motschulsky, 1844
 Harpalus calceatus (Duftschmid, 1812)
 Harpalus caliginosus (Fabricius, 1775)
 Harpalus capicola Dejean, 1829
 Harpalus capito A.Morawitz, 1862
 Harpalus cardoni Antoine, 1922
 Harpalus caspius (Steven, 1806)
 Harpalus cautus Dejean, 1829
 Harpalus cephalotes Fairmaire & Laboulbene, 1854
 Harpalus chalcentus Bates, 1873
 Harpalus chalcopterus Jeannel, 1948
 Harpalus chasanensis Lafer, 1989
 Harpalus chobautianus Lutshnik, 1922
 Harpalus chrysopus Reitter, 1887
 Harpalus circumpunctatus Chaudoir, 1846
 Harpalus cisteloides Motschulsky, 1844
 Harpalus clarkei Kataev & Schmidt, 2020
 Harpalus cohni Ball, 1972 
 Harpalus colchicus Motschulsky, 1850  
 Harpalus compar Leconte, 1848
 Harpalus compressus Motschulsky, 1844
 Harpalus contemptus Dejean, 1829
 Harpalus convexus Faldermann, 1836
 Harpalus cordifer Notman, 1919
 Harpalus coreanus (Tschitscherine, 1895)
 Harpalus corporosus (Motschulsky, 1861)
 Harpalus corpulentus (Casey, 1914) 
 Harpalus corrugatus Basilewsky, 1958
 Harpalus crates Bates, 1883
 Harpalus cupreus Dejean, 1829
 Harpalus cursorius Peringuey, 1896
 Harpalus cyanopterus (Tschitscherine, 1897)
 Harpalus cyclogonus Chaudoir, 1844
 Harpalus cyrtonotoides Notman, 1919 
 Harpalus danieli Reitter, 1900
 Harpalus davidi (Tschitscherine, 1897)
 Harpalus davidianus Tschitscherine, 1903
 Harpalus decipiens Dejean, 1829
 Harpalus defector Peringuey, 1896
 Harpalus desertus Leconte, 1859
 Harpalus diligens Tschitscherine, 1898
 Harpalus dimidiatus (P. Rossi, 1790)
 Harpalus disimuciulus Huang; Lei; Yan & Hu, 1996
 Harpalus dispar Dejean, 1829
 Harpalus dissitus Antoine, 1931
 Harpalus distinguendus (Duftschmid, 1812)
 Harpalus diversicollis Basilewsky, 1958
 Harpalus dubius Boheman, 1848
 Harpalus dudkoi Kataev, 2011
 Harpalus durangoensis Bates, 1891
 Harpalus ebeninus Heyden, 1870
 Harpalus egenus Dejean, 1829
 Harpalus egorovi Lafer, 1989
 Harpalus ellipsis Leconte, 1848
 Harpalus elliptipennis Facchini, 2003
 Harpalus eous Tschitscherine, 1901
 Harpalus eraticus Say, 1823
 Harpalus erosus Mannerheim, 1825
 Harpalus erythropus Dejean, 1829
 Harpalus euchlorus Menetries, 1839
 Harpalus exiguus Boheman, 1848
 Harpalus famelicus Tschitscherine, 1898
 Harpalus farkaci Kataev & Wrase, 1995
 Harpalus faunus Say, 1823
 Harpalus ferghanensis Tschitscherine, 1899
 Harpalus fimetarius Dejean, 1829
 Harpalus flavescens (Piller & Mitterpacher, 1783)
 Harpalus flavicornis Dejean, 1829
 Harpalus fokienensis Schauberger, 1930
 Harpalus foveiger Tschitscherine, 1895
 Harpalus franzi Mateu, 1954
 Harpalus frater Chaudoir, 1876
 Harpalus fraternus Leconte, 1852
 Harpalus froelichii Sturm, 1818
 Harpalus fukiensis Jedlicka, 1956
 Harpalus fulvicornis Thunberg, 1806
 Harpalus fulvilabris Mannerheim, 1853
 Harpalus fulvipennis Chaudoir, 1843  
 Harpalus fulvus Dejean, 1829
 Harpalus fuscicornis Menetries, 1832
 Harpalus fuscipalpis Sturm, 1818
 Harpalus fuscipennis Wiedemann, 1825
 Harpalus fuscoaeneus Dejean, 1829
 Harpalus ganssuensis Semenov, 1889
 Harpalus giacomazzoi Kataev & Wrase, 1996
 Harpalus gilgil Basilewsky, 1946
 Harpalus gisellae Csiki, 1932
 Harpalus glasunovi Kataev, 1987
 Harpalus gravis Leconte, 1858 
 Harpalus gregoryi Alluaud, 1917
 Harpalus grilli Kataev, 2002
 Harpalus griseus (Panzer, 1796)
 Harpalus hartmanni Kataev, 2001
 Harpalus hatchi Ball & Anderson, 1962 
 Harpalus hauserianus Schauberger, 1929
 Harpalus herbivagus Say, 1823
 Harpalus heyrovskyi Jedlicka, 1928
 Harpalus hiekei Kataev & Wrase, 2010
 Harpalus hirtipes (Panzer, 1796)
 Harpalus honestus (Dufischmid, 1812)
 Harpalus hospes Sturm, 1818
 Harpalus huachuca Ball, 1972 
 Harpalus hybridus Boheman, 1848
 Harpalus idiotus Bates, 1889
 Harpalus impressus Roth, 1851
 Harpalus inconcinnus Chaudoir, 1876
 Harpalus indianus Csiki, 1932   
 Harpalus indicola Bates, 1878
 Harpalus indicus Bates, 1891
 Harpalus indigens Casey, 1924
 Harpalus inexspectatus Kataev, 1989
 Harpalus ingenuus Tschitscherine, 1898
 Harpalus innocuus Leconte, 1863
 Harpalus italus Schaum, 1860
 Harpalus janinae Jeanne, 1984
 Harpalus jeanneli Basilewsky, 1946
 Harpalus jordanus Jedlicka, 1964
 Harpalus jureceki (Jedlicka, 1928)
 Harpalus kabakianus Kataev, 1988
 Harpalus kabakovi Kataev, 1987
 Harpalus kadleci Kataev & Wrase, 1995
 Harpalus kadyrbekovi Kataev, 1988
 Harpalus kagyzmanicus Kataev, 1984
 Harpalus kandaharensis Jedlicka, 1956
 Harpalus karamani Apfelbeck, 1902
 Harpalus karokorum Jedlicka, 1958
 Harpalus katiae F.Battoni, 1985 
 Harpalus kazanensis Jedlicka, 1958
 Harpalus kaznakovi Kataev & Wrase, 1997
 Harpalus kibonoti Alluaud, 1926
 Harpalus kirgisicus Motschulsky, 1844
 Harpalus kiritshenkoi Kataev, 1990
 Harpalus klapperichi Jedlicka, 1956
 Harpalus kmecoi Facchini, 2003
 Harpalus koshiensis Kirschenhofer, 1992
 Harpalus kozlovi Kataev, 1993
 Harpalus kryzhanovskii Kataev, 1988
 Harpalus kunarensis Kataev, 1993b: 129
 Harpalus laetus Reiche, 1843
 Harpalus laevipes Zetterstedt, 1828
 Harpalus lama Kataev & Wrase, 1997
 Harpalus lateralis Dejean, 1829
 Harpalus laticeps Leconte, 1850
 Harpalus latus (Linne, 1758)
 Harpalus lederi Tschitscherne, 1899
 Harpalus lethierryi Reiche, 1860
 Harpalus lewisii Leconte, 1865
 Harpalus liobasis Chaudoir, 1868
 Harpalus litigiosus Dejean, 1829
 Harpalus longicollis Leconte, 1848
 Harpalus longipalmatus Mordkovitsh, 1969
 Harpalus lopezi Serrano & Lencina, 2008
 Harpalus lugubris Boheman, 1848
 Harpalus lumbaris Mannerheim, 1825
 Harpalus luteicornis (Dufischmid, 1812)
 Harpalus lutshniki Schauberger, 1932
 Harpalus macronotus Tschitscherine, 1893
 Harpalus mairei Peyerimhoff, 1928
 Harpalus major (Motschulsky, 1850)
 Harpalus makhekensis Basilewsky, 1958
 Harpalus manas Kataev, 1990c: 400
 Harpalus marginellus Gyllenhal, 1827
 Harpalus mariae Kataev, 1997
 Harpalus martini Vandyke, 1926 
 Harpalus masoreoides Bates, 1878
 Harpalus massarti Burgeon, 1935
 Harpalus mauritanicus Gaubil, 1844
 Harpalus medvedevi Kataev, 2006
 Harpalus megacephalus Leconte, 1848
 Harpalus meghalayensis Kataev, 2001
 Harpalus melancholicus Dejean, 1829
 Harpalus melaneus Bates, 1878
 Harpalus meridianus Andrewes, 1923
 Harpalus merkli Kataev, 2021
 Harpalus metallinus Menetries, 1836
 Harpalus metarsius Andrewes, 1930
 Harpalus meteorus Basilewsky, 1946
 Harpalus michaili Kataev, 1990
 Harpalus michailovi Kataev, 1987
 Harpalus microdemas Schauberger, 1932
 Harpalus microthorax (Motschulsky, 1849)
 Harpalus miles Peringuey, 1896
 Harpalus minutissimus Facchini, 2015
 Harpalus minutulus Kataev & Liang, 2004
 Harpalus mitridati Pliginskiy, 1915
 Harpalus mlynari Kataev, 1990
 Harpalus modestus Dejean, 1829
 Harpalus morvani Kataev, 2001
 Harpalus nanniscus Peringuey, 1896
 Harpalus natalensis Boheman, 1848
 Harpalus natalicus Peringuey, 1896
 Harpalus neglectus Audinet-Serville, 1821
 Harpalus nevadensis K. Daniel & J. Daniel, 1898
 Harpalus nigrans A. Morawitz, 1862
 Harpalus nigritarsis C.R. Sahlberg, 1827
 Harpalus numidicus Bedel, 1893
 Harpalus nyassicus Basilewsky, 1946
 Harpalus obliquus G.Horn, 1880 
 Harpalus oblitus Dejean, 1829
 Harpalus obnixus Casey, 1924
 Harpalus ochropus Kirby, 1837
 Harpalus oodioides Dejean, 1829
 Harpalus opacipennis (Haldemann, 1843)
 Harpalus optabilis Dejean, 1829
 Harpalus ovtshinnikovi Kataev, 1990
 Harpalus paivanus Wollaston, 1867
 Harpalus pallidipennis A. Morawitz, 1862
 Harpalus pallipes Chaudoir, 1837
 Harpalus parallelocollis Facchini, 2003
 Harpalus parasinuatus Kataev & Liang, 2007
 Harpalus paratus Casey, 1924
 Harpalus parvulus Dejean, 1829
 Harpalus pastor Motschulsky, 1844
 Harpalus pecinai Hovorka, 2006
 Harpalus pensylvanicus (Degeer, 1774)
 Harpalus perlucens Bates, 1878
 Harpalus petri Tschitscherine, 1902
 Harpalus picipennis (Duftschmid, 1812)
 Harpalus plancyi Tschitscherine, 1897
 Harpalus platynotus Bates, 1873
 Harpalus plenalis Casey, 1914
 Harpalus politus Dejean, 1829
 Harpalus polyglyptus Schaum, 1862
 Harpalus poncei Will, 2001
 Harpalus potanini Tschitscherine, 1906
 Harpalus poussereaui Facchini & Giachino, 2011
 Harpalus praecurrens Schauberger, 1934
 Harpalus praticola Bates, 1891
 Harpalus procognatus Lorenz, 1998
 Harpalus progrediens Schauberger, 1922
 Harpalus prosperus Basilewsky, 1972
 Harpalus protractus Casey, 1914   
 Harpalus providens Casey, 1914
 Harpalus pseudoasemus Kataev, 2021
 Harpalus pseudohauserianus Kataev, 2001
 Harpalus pseudophonoides Schauberger, 1930
 Harpalus pseudoserripes Reitter, 1900
 Harpalus pseudotinctulus Schauberger, 1932
 Harpalus pterostichus (Reitter, 1900)
 Harpalus puetzi Kataev & Wrase, 1997
 Harpalus pulchirinulus Reitter, 1900
 Harpalus pulvinatus Menetries, 1848
 Harpalus pumilus Sturm, 1818
 Harpalus punctatostriatus Dejean, 1829
 Harpalus puncticeps (Casey, 1914)
 Harpalus punctipennis Mulsant, 1852
 Harpalus pusillus (Motschulsky, 1850)
 Harpalus pygmaeus Dejean, 1829
 Harpalus quadratus Chaudoir, 1846
 Harpalus raphaili Kataev, 1997
 Harpalus reflexus Putzeys, 1878
 Harpalus regressus (Casey, 1914) 
 Harpalus remboides Solsky, 1874
 Harpalus retractus Leconte, 1863
 Harpalus reversus Casey, 1924
 Harpalus rivalsi Jeannel, 1948
 Harpalus roninus Bates, 1873
 Harpalus rotundus Facchini, 2003
 Harpalus rougemonti Clarke, 1973
 Harpalus rubefactus Bates, 1873
 Harpalus rubripes (Dufischmid, 1812)
 Harpalus rufipalpis Sturm, 1818
 Harpalus rufipes (Degeer, 1774)
 Harpalus rufiscapus Gebler, 1833
 Harpalus rufitarsoides Schauberger, 1934
 Harpalus rufomarginatus (Boheman, 1848)
 Harpalus rumelicus Apfelbeck, 1904
 Harpalus salinulus Reitter, 1900
 Harpalus salinus Dejean, 1829
 Harpalus sanctaehelenae Basilewsky, 1972
 Harpalus saxicola Dejean, 1829
 Harpalus schaumii Wollaston, 1864
 Harpalus semenowi Tschitscherine, 1901
 Harpalus semipunctatus Dejean, 1829
 Harpalus sericatus Tschitscherine, 1906
 Harpalus serripes (Quensel, 1806)
 Harpalus servus (Duftschmid, 1812)
 Harpalus setiporus (Reitter, 1894)
 Harpalus siculus Dejean, 1829
 Harpalus signaticornis (Duftschmid, 1812)
 Harpalus silipes Dejean, 1831
 Harpalus simplicidens Schauberger, 1929
 Harpalus singularis Tschitscherine, 1906
 Harpalus sinicus Hope, 1845
 Harpalus sinuaticollis Facchini, 2015
 Harpalus sinuatus Tschitscherine, 1893
 Harpalus smaragdinus (Duftschmid, 1812)
 Harpalus smyrnensis Heyden, 1888
 Harpalus solitaris Dejean, 1829
 Harpalus somereni Basilewsky, 1946
 Harpalus somnulentus Dejean, 1829
 Harpalus spadiceus Dejean, 1829
 Harpalus spretus Peringuey, 1896
 Harpalus spurius Peringuey, 1896
 Harpalus stephani Ball, 1972 
 Harpalus stevenii Dejean, 1829
 Harpalus stevensi Kataev, 2011
 Harpalus stoetznerianus Schauberger, 1932
 Harpalus strenuus Tschitscherine, 1898
 Harpalus subaeneus Boheman, 1848
 Harpalus subcylindricus Dejean, 1829
 Harpalus subphaedrus Basilewsky, 1946
 Harpalus subtruncatus Chaudoir, 1846
 Harpalus suensoni Kataev, 1997
 Harpalus sulphuripes Germar, 1824
 Harpalus sushenicus Kataev, 1990
 Harpalus suturangulus Reitter, 1887
 Harpalus szalliesi Kataev & Wrase, 1995
 Harpalus taciturnus Dejean, 1829
 Harpalus tadorcus Ball, 1972
 Harpalus tangutorum Kataev, 1993
 Harpalus tardus (Panzer, 1796)
 Harpalus tarsalis Mannenheim, 1825
 Harpalus tenebrosus Dejean, 1829
 Harpalus terrestris (Motschulsky, 1844)
 Harpalus texanus Casey, 1914 
 Harpalus tibeticus Andrewes, 1930
 Harpalus tichonis Jakobson, 1907
 Harpalus tinctulus Bates, 1873
 Harpalus tiridates Reitter, 1900
 Harpalus tithonus Reitter, 1900
 Harpalus tjanschanicus Semenov, 1889
 Harpalus torosensis Jedlicka, 1961
 Harpalus torridoides Reitter, 1900
 Harpalus trichophorus Tschitscherine, 1897
 Harpalus tridens A.Morawitz, 1862
 Harpalus triseriatus A. Fleischer, 1897
 Harpalus turcicus Jedlicka, 1958
 Harpalus turmalinus Erichson, 1847
 Harpalus udege Lafer, 1989
 Harpalus uniformis (Motschulsky, 1844)
 Harpalus ussuricus Mlynar, 1979
 Harpalus vanemdeni Schauberger, 1932
 Harpalus venator Boheman, 1848
 Harpalus ventralis Leconte, 1848
 Harpalus vereschaginae Kataev, 1988
 Harpalus vernicosus Kataev & Liang, 2007
 Harpalus viridanus Motschulsky, 1844
 Harpalus viridicupreus Reiche, 1843
 Harpalus vittatus Gebler, 1833
 Harpalus wadiensis Jedlicka, 1964
 Harpalus wohlberedti Emden & Schauberger, 1932
 Harpalus xanthopus Gemminger & Harold, 1868
 Harpalus yinchuanensis Huang, 1993
 Harpalus zabroides Dejean, 1829
 Harpalus zhdankoi Kataev, 1990

References

 
Carabidae genera